Consultative Bureau was a provincial advisory institution established in 1909 in each province during the Constitutional Movement in the late Qing Dynasty. 

According to the Regulation of the Consultative Bureau, the meetings of the Bureau were divided into two types: regular meetings and temporary meetings.

Overview
The Consultative Bureau was the local institution of the Advisory Council, and it had a Speaker and two Deputy Speakers.

Except for Xinjiang, all provinces announced the establishment of Consultative Bureaus sequentially. In total, there were 21 Consultative Bureaus throughout the Qing Dynasty.

From March 1909, each province began to elect members of the Consultative Bureau one after another. On October 14, with the exception of Xinjiang, all 21 provincial Consultative Bureaus were established and opened as scheduled, with more than 1,670 members elected. 

The election of members of the Consultative Bureau is the first election of public opinion representatives in the history of Chinese.

See also
Advisory Council (Qing dynasty)

References

Qing dynasty
1909 establishments